Dyersburg is a city in Tennessee.

Dyersburg may also refer to:

 Dyersburg Army Air Base, a former army base
 Dyersburg Deers, a minor league baseball team
 Dyersburg Regional Airport, a city-owned public use airport
 Dyersburg State Community College, a community college in Dyersburg
 Dyersburg, TN Micropolitan Statistical Area, congruous with Dyer County

See also
Dyer (disambiguation)